Mad Professor (born Neil Joseph Stephen Fraser, 1955, Georgetown, Guyana) is a Guyanese-born British dub music producer and engineer known for his original productions and remix work. He is considered one of the leading producers of dub music's second generation and was instrumental in transitioning dub into the digital age. He has collaborated with reggae artists such as Lee "Scratch" Perry, Sly and Robbie, Pato Banton, Jah Shaka and Horace Andy, as well as artists outside the realm of traditional reggae and dub, such as Sade, Massive Attack, The Orb, Gaudi, the Brazilian DJ Marcelinho da lua, Grace Jones, and Perry Farrell.

Biography 
Fraser became known as Mad Professor as a boy due to his fascination with electronics. He emigrated from Guyana to London at the age of 13 and later began his music career as a service technician. He gradually collected recording and mixing equipment and in 1979 opened his own four-track recording studio, Ariwa Sounds, in the living room of his home in Thornton Heath. He began recording lovers rock bands and vocalists for his own label (including the debut recording by Deborahe Glasgow) and recorded his first album after moving the studio to a new location in Peckham in 1982, equipped with an eight-track setup, later expanding to sixteen. Fraser's Dub Me Crazy series of albums won the support of John Peel, who regularly aired tracks from the albums. Although early releases were not big sellers among reggae buyers, the mid-1980s saw this change with releases from Sandra Cross (Country Life), Johnny Clarke, Peter Culture, Pato Banton, and Macka B (Sign of the Times). Fraser moved again, this time to South Norwood, where he set up what was the largest black-owned studio complex in the UK, where he recorded successful lovers rock tracks by Cross, John McLean, and Kofi, and attracted Jamaican artists including Bob Andy and Faybiene Miranda. He teamed up with Lee "Scratch" Perry for the first time in 1983 for the recording of the album Mystic Warrior (1989).

Fraser's son continues his father's musical tradition, producing dub under the alias, Joe Ariwa.

Recordings 

Mad Professor has released hundreds of original recordings and has worked with a number of reggae and non-reggae artists. He is perhaps best known for his 12 instalments of the Dub Me Crazy series and 5 albums under the Black Liberation Dub banner. The following is a partial discography of his original releases including collaborations with other artists and remixes.

Original recordings 
1983 – In A Rub A Dub Style
1985 – A Caribbean Taste of Technology
1992 – True Born African Dub
1994 – The Lost Scrolls of Moses
1995 – It's A Mad, Mad, Mad, Mad Professor
1997 – RAS Portraits
2001 – Dubbing You Crazy
2001 – Trix in the Mix
2005 – Method to the Madness
2007 – Dub You Crazy
2008 – The Dubs That Time Forgot
2009 – Audio Illusions of Dub
 2012 – The Roots of Dubstep

Dub Me Crazy series 
1982 – Dub Me Crazy
1982 – Beyond The Realms of Dub (Dub Me Crazy, Pt.2)
1983 – The African Connection (Dub Me Crazy, Pt.3)
1983 – Escape to the Asylum of Dub (Dub Me Crazy, Pt.4)
1985 – Who Knows The Secret of the Master Tape (Dub Me Crazy, Pt.5)
1986 – Schizophrenic Dub (Dub Me Crazy, Pt.6)
1987 – Adventures of a Dub Sampler (Dub Me Crazy, Pt.7)
1988 – Experiments of the Aural Kind (Dub Me Crazy, Pt.8)
1989 – Science and the Witchdoctor (Dub Me Crazy, Pt.9)
1990 – Psychedelic Dub (Dub Me Crazy, Pt. 10)
1992 – Hijacked To Jamaica (Dub Me Crazy, Pt.11)
1993 – Dub Maniacs on the Rampage (Dub Me Crazy, Pt.12)

Black Liberation series 
1994 – Black Liberation Dub (Chapter 1)
1995 – Anti-Racist Dub Broadcast (Black Liberation Chapter 2)
1996 – The Evolution of Dub (Black Liberation Chapter 3)
1997 – Under The Spell of Dub (Black Liberation Chapter 4)
1999 – Afrocentric Dub (Black Liberation Chapter 5)

Dub You Crazy With Love Series 
1997 – Dub You Crazy With Love
2000 – Dub You Crazy With Love (Part 2)
2008 – Bitter Sweet Dub

Collaborations

With Lee "Scratch" Perry 
1990 – Mystic Warrior
1995 – Black Ark Experryments
1995 – Super Ape Inna Jungle
1996 – Experryments at the Grass Roots of Dub
1996 – Who Put The Voodoo Pon Reggae
1996 – Dub Take the Voodoo Out of Reggae
1998 – Live at Maritime Hall
1998 – Fire in Dub
2000 – Lee Perry Meets Mad Professor
2001 – Techno Dub

With other artists 
1981 - Kunte Kinte (with Aquizim)
1982 – Rhythm Collision Dub (with Ruts DC)
1983 – Punky Reggae Party (Positive Style) – Anti Social Workers
1984 – Jah Shaka Meets Mad Professor at Ariwa Sounds
1985 – Mad Professor Captures Pato Banton
1989 – Mad Professor Recaptures Pato Banton
1989 – Mad Professor Meets Puls Der Zeit
1989 – Mad Professor Feat The Man Ezeke Remix an Dub for Sheila Giles
1990 – A Feast of Yellow Dub (with Yellowman)
1995 – No Protection (Massive Attack v Mad Professor)
1996 – New Decade of Dub (with Jah Shaka)
2000 – The Inspirational Sounds of Mad Professor
2000 – Marseille London Experience (with Massilia Sound System)
2003 – Psychobelly Dance Music (with Baba Zula)
2004 – Dub Revolutionaries (with Sly and Robbie)
2004 – From The Roots (with Horace Andy)
2004 – In A Dubwise Style (with Marcelinho da Lua)
2005 – Moroccan Sunrise (with Borrah)
2005 – Dancehall Dubs (with Crazy Caribs)
2009 – Revolution Feat. Pato Banton And Mr. Professor (With Tugg)
2009 – Nairobi Meets Mad Professor – Wu Wei
2010 – Izrael Meets Mad Professor and Joe Ariwa
2010 – Frente Cumbiero Meets Mad Professor
2010 – Rewired in Dub (with Pama International)
2011 - Rewired in Dub (with Horace Andy)
2012 – The Roots of Dubstep
2013 – Cedric Congo Meets Mad Professor
2014 - Method to the Madness (various Ariwa artists)
2017 - In The Midst Of The Storm (Mad Professor Meets Jah9)
2019 - Massive Attack vs Mad Professor Part II (Mezzanine Remix Tapes ’98)
2019 – Mad Professor meets Gaudi

Remixes 
Since the 1990s he has remixed tracks by Sade, The Orb, The KLF, Beastie Boys, Jamiroquai, Rancid, Depeche Mode, Perry Farrell and Japanese pop singer Ayumi Hamasaki. His best-known project, perhaps, is 1995's No Protection, an electronic dub version of Massive Attack's second album, Protection. He has also done a version of I&I for New Zealand reggae band Katchafire, three versions for New Zealand electronic group Salmonella Dub and twelve remixes for Japanese musician Ayumi Hamasaki.

No Protection – "Dub version of Massive Attack album Protection" (1995)
A second remix album with Massive Attack is slated for release in 2018
Soul Coughing – "Sugar Free Jazz (Multiple Remixes (Most were released on the Sugar Free Jazz: Slash In-House Cassette))" (1995)
Black Orpheus Dub – Dub version of Black Orpheus for the AIDS-benefit album Red Hot + Rio produced by the Red Hot Organization (1996)
Urrun Dub – Dub version of Fermin Muguruza's  Urrun (1999)
Salmonella Dub – "For The Love of It" (1999)
Ayumi Hamasaki – "Who... (Who Dub It?)" from ayu-mi-x II Version US+EU (2000
Ayumi Hamasaki – "key (ARIWA Dub Mix)" from ayu-mi-x III Non-Stop Mega Mix Version
Salmonella Dub – "Tui Dub" (2002)
Ayumi Hamasaki – "Hanabi (Ariwa Dub Mix)" from RMX Works from Ayu-mi-x 5 Non-Stop Mega Mix (2003)
Salmonella Dub – "Mercy" (2004)
Miss Kittin – "Happy Violentine (Mad Professor Smiling Orange Dub)" (2005)
Ayumi Hamasaki – "Happy Ending (Mad Professor Remix)" from Ayu-mi-x 6: Gold (2008)

References

Interviews
Interview in Remix Magazine
Interview at niceups.com

External links

Aanmelden bij Facebook | Facebook
Ariwa Sounds Website

Dub musicians
Dubtronica musicians
People from Georgetown, Guyana
Guyanese reggae singers
1955 births
20th-century Guyanese male singers
21st-century Guyanese male singers
Living people